The Robert Verdi Show is an American reality series that aired from February 10 until April 14, 2010.

Premise
Stylist Robert Verdi tries to balance his professional life with his private life.

Cast
Robert Verdi

Episodes

References

External links
 
TV Guide

2010 American television series debuts
2010 American television series endings
2010s American reality television series
English-language television shows
Logo TV original programming